Tore Anton Holm (25 November 1896 – 15 November 1977) was a Swedish yacht designer, boatbuilder, and sailor who competed in the 1920, 1928, 1932, 1936 and 1948 Summer Olympics.

Sailing career

He started out in 1920 as a crew member on the Swedish boat Sif, where he won the gold medal in the 40 m² class and eight years later he conquered the bronze medal, as a crew member on the Sylvia in the 8 metre class. In 1932 he won his second gold medal, this time being on the crew of the Bissbi, in the 6 metre class. At the Olympic Games in Berlin, 1936, he did not win a medal after finishing fourth in the 8 metre class competition.
He finished his Olympic career in 1948 on the 6 metre class with his fourth medal, and second bronze, as part of the crew on the Ali Baba II.

Yacht designer

In the early 1920s, the Holm boatyard at Gamleby designed and built a number of boats in the Skerry Cruiser (or Square Metre Rule) Class. In the later 1920s and 1930s several more designs came to fruition built to the International or Metre Rule, particularly in the 6m, 8m and 10m classes.

Posthumous build of J-class yacht
In 2014 it was reported that a new J-Class hull, Svea, was under construction at the Freddie Bloemsma Aluminiumbouw shipyard in the Netherlands to an original design by Tore Holm dating from 1937. In 2015 it was reported that outfitting would be undertaken at the Vitters Shipyard. She competed briefly in the 2017 J-Class regatta at Bermuda before her headstay furler broke. During racing in the Superyacht Challenge Antigua in 2020 she was in collision with fellow J-class competitor Topaz.

Selected list of Tore Holm yacht designs

Notes

References

External links

 
 
 
 

1896 births
1977 deaths
Swedish male sailors (sport)
Olympic sailors of Sweden
Sailors at the 1920 Summer Olympics – 40m2 Skerry cruiser
Sailors at the 1928 Summer Olympics – 8 Metre
Sailors at the 1932 Summer Olympics – 6 Metre
Sailors at the 1936 Summer Olympics – 8 Metre
Sailors at the 1948 Summer Olympics – 6 Metre
Olympic gold medalists for Sweden
Olympic bronze medalists for Sweden
Olympic medalists in sailing
Norrköpings Segelsällskap sailors
Royal Swedish Yacht Club sailors
Swedish yacht designers
Medalists at the 1948 Summer Olympics
Medalists at the 1932 Summer Olympics
Medalists at the 1928 Summer Olympics
Medalists at the 1920 Summer Olympics